Claude Adelen (born 23 May 1944, Paris) is a French poet and literary critic.

Works 
1968: Ordre du jour, Paris, Éditions Pierre Jean Oswald, 79 p. 
1975: Bouche à la terre, Paris, Action poétique,  46 p. 
1977: Légendaire, Paris, Les Éditeurs réunis, series "Petite sirène", 94 p. 
1985: Marches forcées, Baillé, France, URSA, 72 p. 
1989: Intempéries, Moulins, France, Éditions Ipomée, series "Tadorne ", 167 p. 
1995: Le Nom propre de l'amour, Bruxelles, Belgique, Éditions Le Cri, series "In'hui", 110 p. 
2001: Aller où rien ne parle. Un choix, 1996-2000, Tours, France, Éditions Farrago, series "Biennale internationale des poètes en Val-de-Marne", 60 p. 
2002: Soleil en mémoire, Creil - Reims, France, Éditions Dumerchez, series "Double hache", 142 p. 
 - Prix Guillaume Apollinaire 2002
2005: D'où pas même la voix, Liancourt, France, Éditions Dumerchez, series "Double hache", 85 p. 
 - Prix Louise-Labé 
2009: Légendaire. 1969-2005, Paris, Éditions Flammarion, series "Poésie", 322 p. 
 -  Prix Théophile-Gautier 2010, médaille de bronze 

2012: Obligé d'être ici, Sens, France, Éditions Obsidiane, 93 p. 

 Literary critic
1995: Henri Deluy, une passion de l'immédiat, Paris, Éditions Fourbis, 228 p. 

2004: L'Émotion concrète. Chroniques de poésie, Chambéry, France, Éditions Comp'Act, series "Le corps certain", 275 p.

References

External links 
 Claude Adelen on M.E.L.
 Claude Adelen : L’homme qui marche on Cahier critique de poésie
 Claude Adelen on Babelio
 Claude Adelen on France Culture
 La relation amoureuse dans et par le langage on Hypothèses .org
 Claude Adelen on the site of the Académie française

20th-century French poets
21st-century French poets
21st-century French male writers
French literary critics
Prix Guillaume Apollinaire winners
Writers from Paris
1944 births
Living people
20th-century French male writers
French male non-fiction writers